Yao Chun-yao or Jack Yao (born 29 October 1984) is a Taiwanese actor and television host. He is best known for his role in the critically acclaimed 2010 Taiwanese film Au Revoir Taipei, which won the NETPAC Award at the 2010 Berlin International Film Festival. He is also known for hosting the Taiwanese long-running television show Stories in Taiwan. He won Best Host for a Travel Program at the 51st Golden Bell Awards.

Filmography

As host

Film

Television series

Music videos

Awards and nominations

References 
 【一頁台北】演員介紹：姚淳耀─飾「小凱」
  郭采潔成軍中情人　姚淳耀從當兵時就愛慕
 百年復甦: 姚淳耀終於進了戲劇的黃金屋
 幾米走向春天的下午導演及演員介紹

External links

Living people
1984 births
Taiwanese television presenters
Male actors from Taipei
21st-century Taiwanese male actors
Taiwanese male film actors
Taiwanese male television actors